Texans for a Republican Majority or TRMPAC (pronounced "trimpac") is a general-purpose political action committee registered with the Texas Ethics Commission.  It was founded in 2001 by former Republican Texas U.S. Rep. and House Majority Leader Tom DeLay.

History
TRMPAC was founded on September 5, 2001, with the goal of naming a Republican Speaker in Texas and promoting the Republican party's agenda within the state.  John Colyandro was selected by Jim Ellis and Tom DeLay (R-Texas) to be executive director.  Colyandro selected Dallas businessman Bill Ceverha as treasurer.

Lawsuit
A lawsuit brought against TRMPAC and Bill Ceverha as Treasurer brought by five Democratic candidates resulted in a court order to pay $196,600 in damages and attorney fees. Ceverha later stated that the case had cost him in excess of $850,000. Ceverha subsequently filed for bankruptcy. The case against the other two parties named in the suit, John Colyandro and Jim Ellis has been stayed pending the outcome of criminal charges against them.

Ceverha was later criticized for refusing to reveal the amount of a gift received from GOP donor Bob Perry despite holding a state post requiring a description of gifts under the state ethics laws. Ceverha claimed that the disclosure law was satisfied by describing the gift as 'check'.

Indictments
Currently, several key members, lobbyists and officials associated with the organization are under indictment by a grand jury for felony violations of state campaign finance laws such as  applying corporate campaign contributions (which may be used only for administrative expenses) to political campaigns. In September 2002, TRMPAC donated $190,000 to the Republican National Committee, which within days sent $190,000 raised from individuals to seven GOP House candidates.

James W. Ellis, the committee's director, has been indicted for money laundering in connection with this investigation. In addition, Americans for a Republican Majority head Jim Ellis and John Colyandro, former executive director of Texans for a Republican Majority, were both charged in September 2005 with violating Texas election law and criminal conspiracy to violate the election law.

Preston, Gates, Ellis & Rouvelas Meeds, reportedly lobbied for at least one donor to Texans for a Republican Majority, and also contributed $25,000 to TRM itself. It has been reported that former DeLay aide Michael Scanlon worked on the Preston Gates account for the firm making the donation, Burlington Northern.

Warren Robold, a national Republican fundraiser who solicited money for TRMPAC from several of the indicted corporations, faced nine third-degree felony charges of 'making and accepting' prohibited corporate contributions.

Under Texas law, corporate donations may be used in state campaigns for administrative costs such as clerical needs or rent, but not for any purpose that might be used to influence voters.

Films
2006 - The Big Buy: Tom DeLay's Stolen Congress. Directed by Mark Birnbaum and Jim Schermbeck.

See also
Americans for a Republican Majority

References

External links
 Moreno, S. & Smith, R.F. (2005). Treasurer of DeLay Group Broke Texas Election Law. Washington Post, May 27
 Smith, R.F. (2005). DeLay Indicted in Texas Finance Probe. Washington Post, September 29

Republican Party (United States) organizations
United States political action committees
Politics of Texas
Tom DeLay